The  Asian Baseball Championship was the eighth continental tournament held by the Baseball Federation of Asia. The tournament was held in Taipei, Taiwan for the second time. Won by Japan for the sixth time, it was the third consecutive Asian Championship for the team; the second such sequence for Japan. It was only the second time in the tournament's history that the Philippines team medalled, winning the bronze medal. Taiwan (2nd) and South Korea (4th) were the other participants.

See also
 List of sporting events in Taiwan

References

Bibliography 
 

1969
1969
Asian Baseball Championship
1969 in Taiwanese sport
Sports competitions in Taipei
20th century in Taipei